The 1969 Delaware Fightin' Blue Hens football team was an American football team that represented the University of Delaware in the Middle Atlantic Conference during the 1969 NCAA College Division football season. In its fourth season under head coach Tubby Raymond, the team compiled a 9–2 record (6–0 against MAC opponents), won the MAC University Division championship, defeated  in the Boardwalk Bowl, and outscored all opponents by a total of 383 to 156. Joe Purzycki was the team captain. The team played its home games at Delaware Stadium in Newark, Delaware.

Schedule

References

Delaware
Delaware Fightin' Blue Hens football seasons
Delaware Fightin' Blue Hens football